= Acaua exotica =

Scientific classification
- Domain: Eukaryota
- Kingdom: Animalia
- Phylum: Arthropoda
- Class: Insecta
- Order: Coleoptera
- Suborder: Polyphaga
- Infraorder: Cucujiformia
- Family: Cerambycidae
- Genus: Acaua
- Species: A. exotica

Binomial name
- Acaua exotica Martins & Galileo, 1995

Species of beetle

Acaua exotica is a species of beetle in the family Cerambycidae, and the only species in the genus Acaua. It was described by Martins and Galileo in 1995.
